Great Knoutberry Hill, also commonly known as Widdale Fell, is a mountain located near Dent at the heads of Ribblesdale, Dentdale and Wensleydale in the Yorkshire Dales National Park. The Cumbria/North Yorkshire border runs over the fell.

Great Knoutberry Hill is an imposing sight for anyone walking on the Dales Way Long Distance Footpath on long road section from Ribblesdale to Dent Head. The best approach to its summit is from this section of the Dales Way by leaving the path at Stonehouse Farm and following the Arten Gill path up Dent Fell towards Widdale and leaving it to complete the ascent before returning in the direction one came.
The views are pleasant with views centralised amongst the Yorkshire three peaks, to Wild Boar Fell and the Lakeland fells to the north.

References

Marilyns of England
Hewitts of England
Peaks of the Yorkshire Dales
Nuttalls
Hawes
Dent, Cumbria